Something Good may refer to:

 Something Good (album), a 2002 album by Catherine Porter
 "Something Good" (Paul Haig song), 1989
 "Something Good" (Bic Runga song), 2002
 "Something Good" (Utah Saints song), 1992
 "Something Good" (alt-J song), 2012
 "Something Good" (Richard Rodgers song), 1965, a song from the film The Sound of Music
 "Something Good", by Estelle from True Romance
Something Good – Negro Kiss, 1898 short film

See also
 "I'm into Something Good", a 1964 song by Herman's Hermits